The Fâneața Mare is a left tributary of the river Barcău in Romania. It discharges into the Barcău in Tămășeu.

References

Rivers of Romania
Rivers of Bihor County